The Victor Cicero Kays House is a historic house at 2506 Aggie Road, on the campus of Arkansas State University in Jonesboro, Arkansas. It is a -story structure, designed by Arthur N. McAninch and built in 1936 for Victor Cicero Kays, the first president of the university. It is also locally notable as a fine example of Tudor Revival architecture, with a brick first floor, and the second finished in brick and half-timbered stucco. The roof is finished in green tile.

The house was listed on the National Register of Historic Places in 2014.

See also
National Register of Historic Places listings in Craighead County, Arkansas

References

Houses on the National Register of Historic Places in Arkansas
Houses in Craighead County, Arkansas
Arkansas State University
National Register of Historic Places in Craighead County, Arkansas
Buildings and structures in Jonesboro, Arkansas
Houses completed in 1936